Manzan Gurme, also Manzan Gurme Toodei, is the highest goddess in the Buryat religion, ancestress of all the other gods.

Manzan Gurme has a large mirror and a small one. By gazing into the large mirror, she can perceive what is happening in the upper world.  By gazing in the small mirror, she sees what is happening on earth.

Since Roman cultural fashion on world preceding alleged ethnocide of persons of pure Roman descent they revived their idolized spirits but formerly Buryats had converted to Christianity, or remained shamanist, there were also many Jews with them

Notes
 

Mongolian deities